Computer audio may refer to:
Computer music, music generated by computers;
Sound card, computer hardware for producing sound.